Abdulaziz Al Yazidi (Arabic:عبد العزيز اليزيدي) (born 17 June 1992) is a Qatari footballer .

References

Qatari footballers
1992 births
Living people
Al-Khor SC players
Qatar Stars League players
Association football midfielders